Luciano Cigno (born 29 February 1988 in Argentina) is an Argentinean footballer who last played for Empire Club in Barbados.

Career
Cigno started his senior career with Club Atlético Vélez Sarsfield. In 2012, he signed for Club Almagro in the Argentinean Primera B Metropolitana, where he made twenty-one appearances and scored two goals. After that, he played for Sportivo Dock Sud, Maccabi Ahi Nazareth, Club Atlético Ciclón, Sacachispas Fútbol Club, Old Road, and Empire   Club.

References

External links 
 
 
 Luciano Cigno, the Argentine scorer in Barbados
 The Cigno brothers: players in an unusual Caribbean destination
 Both players played in first division teams in Argentina: Luciano and Fernando Cigno, a story of brotherhood reflected in the Ciclón club
 Los Cigno, two rising brothers with a pending account
 Interview with Luciano Cigno

1988 births
Living people
Argentine footballers
Association football midfielders
Club Atlético Vélez Sarsfield footballers
AC Bellinzona players
Club Almagro players
Sportivo Dock Sud players
Maccabi Ahi Nazareth F.C. players
Club Atlético Ciclón players
Sacachispas Fútbol Club players
El Porvenir footballers
Old Road F.C. players
Argentine Primera División players
Primera B Metropolitana players
Primera C Metropolitana players
Torneo Argentino B players
Liga Leumit players
Argentine expatriate footballers
Argentine expatriate sportspeople in Israel
Argentine expatriate sportspeople in Antigua and Barbuda
Expatriate footballers in Israel
Expatriate footballers in Antigua and Barbuda
Footballers from Buenos Aires